James Doherty may refer to:

 James Doherty (actor) (born 1966), English actor
 Jim Doherty (footballer) (born 1958), Scottish footballer
Jim Doherty (musician) (born 1939), Irish jazz pianist
 Jim Doherty (shooter), Irish clay pigeon shooter
 Jimmy Doherty (born 1975), English farmer and television presenter
 Jimmy Doherty (Third Watch character), fictional firefighter in the American TV series

See also
 James Edward O'Doherty (1848–1932), Irish lawyer and politician
 Jim O'Doherty, American television producer, writer and actor
 James Dougherty (disambiguation)